The Kleist Prize is an annual German literature prize. The prize was first awarded in 1912, on the occasion of the hundredth anniversary of the death of Heinrich von Kleist. The Kleist Prize was the most important literary award of the Weimar Republic, but was discontinued in 1933.

In 1985 the prize was awarded for the first time in over fifty years. Between 1994 and 2000 it was awarded biennially. A monetary sum of €20,000 accompanies the award.

Winners
Listings of the Kleist Prize winners are maintained by the Kleist-Archiv Sembdner. and Kleist Gesellschaft

1912–1932

1912 Hermann Burte and Reinhard Sorge
1913 Hermann Essig and Oskar Loerke
1914 Fritz von Unruh and Hermann Essig
1915 Robert Michel and Arnold Zweig
1916 Agnes Miegel and Heinrich Lersch
1917 Walter Hasenclever
1918 Leonhard Frank and Paul Zech
1919 Anton Dietzenschmidt and Kurt Heynicke
1920 Hans Henny Jahnn
1921 Paul Gurk
1922 Bertolt Brecht
1923 Wilhelm Lehmann and Robert Musil
1924 Ernst Barlach
1925 Carl Zuckmayer
1926 Alexander Lernet-Holenia and Alfred Neumann (Rahel Sanzara did not accept her prize), Honorable Mention: Martin Kessel
1927 Gerhard Menzel and Hans Meisel
1928 Anna Seghers
1929 Alfred Brust and Eduard Reinacher
1930 Reinhard Goering
1931 Ödön von Horvath and Erik Reger
1932 Richard Billinger and Else Lasker-Schüler

1933–1984
Discontinued

1985–present

1985 Alexander Kluge for Die Macht der Gefühle
1986 Diana Kempf for Der Wanderer
1987 Thomas Brasch for Robert, ich, Fastnacht und die anderen
1988 Ulrich Horstmann
1989 Ernst Augustin for Der amerikanische Traum
1990 Heiner Müller for Hamletmaschine
1991 Gaston Salvatore for Lektionen der Finsternis
1992 Monika Maron for Stille Zeile Sechs
1993 Ernst Jandl for life works
1994 Herta Müller for Herztier
1996 Hans Joachim Schädlich for Der Kuckuck und die Nachtigall
1998 Dirk von Petersdorff for Wie es weitergeht & Zeitlösung
2000 Barbara Honigmann for Alles, alles Liebe!
2001 Judith Hermann for Sommerhaus, später
2002 Martin Mosebach for Eine lange Nacht, Der Nebenfürst & Das Grab der Pulcinellen
2003 Albert Ostermaier for Vatersprache
2004 Emine Sevgi Özdamar for Seltsame Sterne starren zur Erde. Wedding – Pankow 1976/77
2005 Gert Jonke for Seltsame Sache & Die versunkene Kathedrale
2006 Daniel Kehlmann for Ich und Kaminski & Die Vermessung der Welt
2007 Wilhelm Genazino for Mittelmäßiges Heimweh
2008 Max Goldt for life works
2009 Arnold Stadler (destined by Péter Esterházy) for Einmal auf der Welt. Und dann so
2010 Ferdinand von Schirach for Verbrechen
2011 Sibylle Lewitscharoff for Blumenberg
2012 Navid Kermani for life works
2013 Katja Lange-Müller for life works
2015 Monika Rinck
2016 Yoko Tawada
2017 Ralf Rothmann
2018 Christoph Ransmayr
2019 Ilma Rakusa
2020 Clemens J. Setz
2021 not awarded
2022 Esther Kinsky

See also
 German literature
 List of literary awards
 List of years in literature
 List of years in poetry

References

External links
 Heinrich von Kleist Gesellschaft 

Heinrich von Kleist
German literary awards